Conchoderma is a genus of goose barnacles in the family Lepadidae.

Notes

References

Further reading
Southward, A.J. (2001). Cirripedia - non-parasitic Thoracica, in: Costello, M.J. et al. (Ed.) (2001). European register of marine species: a check-list of the marine species in Europe and a bibliography of guides to their identification. Collection Patrimoines Naturels, 50: pp. 280-283
Neave, Sheffield Airey. (1939). Nomenclator Zoologicus Online. [print version]., available online at http://ubio.org/NomenclatorZoologicus/
Hayward, P.J.; Ryland, J.S. (Ed.). (1990). The marine fauna of the British Isles and North-West Europe: 1. Introduction and protozoans to arthropods. Clarendon Press: Oxford, UK. . 627 pp.

Barnacles
Maxillopoda genera
Taxa named by Ignaz von Olfers